Adam Hollier is the director of the Michigan Veterans Affairs Agency and was appointed by Gov. Gretchen Whitmer. Hollier served in the Michigan Senate, representing the 2nd Senate district, serving Wayne County including Detroit, the Grosse Pointes, Hamtramck, Harper Woods, and Highland Park from 2018 to 2022.

Early life and education 
Hollier was born and raised in the North End of Detroit. As the son of  retired social worker, Jacquelene Hollier, and retired Detroit Fire Department Captain and Wayne County Health Department Training Officer, Carl Hollier, service to people and the community were ingrained in Hollier from a young age.
 

Hollier is a graduate of Detroit Public Schools.  He earned a Bachelor of Arts degree in labor relations from Cornell University, where he played safety on the football team and was a decathlete. Hollier enlisted in the United States Army and later served as a civil affairs officer in the United States Army Reserve. He earned a Master of Urban Planning from the University of Michigan.

Hollier is of Black and Native American descent.

Career 
Hollier served as a volunteer firefighter before enlisting in the United States Army and graduating with distinction from officer candidate school, where he earned the commission of 2nd Lieutenant.  Hollier currently serves as a captain paratrooper and team leader in the 412th Civil Affairs Battalion Airborne. Prior to joining the Senate, Hollier served as director of government affairs for the Michigan Fitness Foundation. He began his career in public service in roles as a staffer in the state legislature and with local officials in the city of Detroit, where his efforts were instrumental in developing policies that protected seniors and facilitated the installation of 64,000 new lights to make neighborhoods safe.

In 2014, Hollier ran in the Michigan House of Representatives 4th district Democratic primary, but lost to incumbent Rose Mary Robinson. He was elected to the Michigan Senate in 2018, and served as the sergeant-at-arms and parliamentarian of the Michigan Legislative Black Caucus.

In 2022, he was a candidate for the Democratic nomination to represent Michigan's 13th congressional district in the House of Representatives.

In the state legislature, Hollier's championed a successful resolution to replace the statue of Lewis Cass in the National Statuary Hall Collection with a statue of Coleman Young, the first Black mayor of Detroit.

On December 02, 2022, Hollier was appointed director of the Michigan Veterans Affairs Agency by Gov. Gretchen Whitmer starting January 1, 2023.

Personal life 
Hollier and his wife, Krystle, live in Detroit with their daughter Lillian and son AJ. 
Hollier enjoys spending time with his family, woodworking, and setting fitness goals in running, CrossFit, and Brazilian jiu-jitsu. He is a member of Alpha Phi Alpha.

Awards
Hollier was named to Michigan Chronicle's 40 under 40 in 2013, Crain's 20 in their 20s in 2015, and the Michigan Chronicle Men of Excellence in 2021.

Other positions
Assistant Professor of Teaching of Urban Studies and Planning at Wayne State University

References

External links
Official Website

21st-century African-American politicians
21st-century American politicians
21st-century Native American politicians
African-American state legislators in Michigan
Candidates in the 2022 United States House of Representatives elections
Cornell University alumni
Living people
Democratic Party Michigan state senators
Military personnel from Michigan
United States Army officers
United States Army reservists
University of Michigan alumni
African-American Catholics
Native American Roman Catholics
1985 births